Hot Pavements of Cologne (German: Heisses Pflaster Köln) is a 1967 West German crime film directed by  Ernst Hofbauer and starring Richard Münch, Walter Kohut and Arthur Brauss.

The film's sets were designed by the art director Karl Schneider. Location shooting took place around Cologne.

Cast
 Richard Münch as Public Prosecutor Dr. Rolf Stauffer 
 Walter Kohut  as Poldi 
 Arthur Brauss  as Paul Keil 
 Beate Hasenau as Betty 
 Angelica Ott  as Mady 
 Doris Kunstmann  as Susanne 
 Klaramaria Skala  as Lore Stauffer
 Claus Ringer  as Ernst Stauffer 
 Klaus Löwitsch  as Willy 
 Rainer Basedow  as Helmut 
 Claus Tinney  as Freddy 
 Monika Zinnenberg  as Vera 
 Doris Arden  as Lissy 
 Monika Rasky as Marion 
 Lisa Helwig  as Tantchen 
 Dirk Dautzenberg  as Alfons Schulz 
 Eric Pohlmann as Benno Trooger 
 Christine Schuberth  as Prostituierte 
 Jos Hartmann  as Gustav Keil 
 Jacques Bézard as Emil 
 Herbert Fux  as Stefan 
 Günther Ungeheuer as Landgerichtsrat 
 Petra Schürmann as Fernsehansagerin

References

Bibliography
 Peter Cowie & Derek Elley. World Filmography: 1967. Fairleigh Dickinson University Press, 1977.

External links

1967 films
1967 crime films
German crime films
West German films
1960s German-language films
Films directed by Ernst Hofbauer
Gloria Film films
Films set in Cologne
Films about prostitution in Germany
1960s German films